was a Japanese writer of novels, short stories and poetry, who is included in the feminist literature canon. Among her best-known works are Diary of a Vagabond,  Late Chrysanthemum and Floating Clouds.

Biography
Hayashi was born in Moji-ku, Kitakyūshū, Japan, and raised in abject poverty. In 1910, her mother Kiku Hayashi divorced her merchant husband Mayaro Miyata (who was not Fumiko's biological father) and married Kisaburo Sawai. The family then worked as itinerant merchants in Kyūshū. 

After graduating from high school in 1922, Hayashi moved to Tokyo and lived with several men, supporting herself with a variety of jobs, before settling into marriage with painting student Rokubin Tezuka in 1926. During this time, she also helped launch the poetry magazine Futari. Her autobiographical novel Diary of a Vagabond (Hōrōki), published in 1930, became a bestseller and gained her high popularity. Many of her subsequent works also showed an autobiographical background, like The Accordion and the Fish Town or Seihin no sho. In the following years, Hayashi travelled to China and Europe. 

Starting in 1938, Hayashi, who had joined the Pen butai ("Pen Corps"), war correspondents who were in favour of Japan's militarist regime, wrote reports about the Sino-Japanese War. In 1941, she joined a group of women writers, including Ineko Sata, who went to Manchuria in occupied China. In 1942–43, again as part of a larger group of women writers, she travelled to Southeast Asia, where she spent eight months in the Andaman Islands, Singapore, Java and Borneo. In later years, Hayashi faced criticism for collaborating with state-sponsored wartime propaganda, but, unlike Sata, never apologised or rationalised her behaviour.

Writer Yoshiko Shibaki observed a shift from poetic sentiment towards harsh reality in Hayashi's post-war work, which depicted the effects of the war on the lives of its survivors, as in the short story Downtown. In 1948, she was awarded the 3rd Women Literary Award for her short story Late Chrysanthemum (Bangiku). Her last novel Meshi, which appeared in serialised form in the Asahi Shimbun, remained unfinished due to her sudden death.

Hayashi died of myocardial infarction on June 28, 1951, survived by her husband and her adopted son. Her funeral was officiated by writer and friend Yasunari Kawabata. Hayashi's house in Shinjuku Ward, Tokyo, was later turned into a museum, the Hayashi Fumiko Memorial Hall. In Onomichi, where Hayashi had lived in her teen years, a bronze figure was erected in her memory.

Themes and legacy
Many of Hayashi's stories revolve around free spirited women and troubled relationships. Joan E. Ericson's 1997 translations and analysis of the immensely popular Diary of a Vagabond and Narcissus suggest that Hayashi's appeal is rooted in the clarity with which she conveys the humanity not just of women, but also others on the underside of Japanese society. In addition, Ericson questions the factuality of her autobiographical writings and expresses a critical view of scholars who take these writings by word instead of, as has been done with male writers, seeing a literary imagination at work which transforms the personal experience, not simply mirrors it. 

In Japanese Women Writers: Twentieth Century Short Fiction, Noriko Mizuta Lippit and Kyoko Iriye Selden point out that, other than her autobiographical portrayals of women, Hayashi's later stories are "pure fiction finished with artistic mastery". Hayashi herself explained that she took this step to separate herself from the "retching confusion" of Diary of a Vagabond.

One of her short stories, Tokio, was translated into Finnish and featured in a Finnish literary magazine, Parnasso, in 1959.

Selected works

 1929: I Saw a Pale Horse (Aouma o mitari) – poetry collection. Translated by Janice Brown.
 1930: Diary of a Vagabond (Hōrōki) – novel. Translated by Joan E. Ericson.
 1931: The Accordion and the Fish Town (Fukin to uo no machi) – short story. Translated by Janice Brown.
 1933: Seihin no sho – short story
 1934: Nakimushi kozo – novel
 1936: Inazuma – novel
 1947: Uzushio – novel
 1947: Downfall (Rinraku) – short story. Translated by J.D. Wisgo.
 1948: Downtown (Daun taun) – short story. Translated by Ivan Morris.
 1948: Late Chrysanthemum (Bangiku) – short story. Translated twice by John Bester and Lane Dunlop.
 1949: Shirosagi – short story
 1949: Narcissus (Suisen) – short story. Translated twice by Kyoko Iriye Selden and Joan E. Ericson.
 1950: Chairo no me – novel
 1951: Floating Clouds (Ukigumo) – novel. Translated twice by Y. Koitabashi and Lane Dunlop.
 1951: Meshi – novel (unfinished)

Adaptations (selected)
Numerous of Hayashi's works have been adapted into film:
 1938: Nakimushi kozo, dir. Shirō Toyoda
 1951: Repast (based on Meshi), dir. Mikio Naruse
 1952: Lightning (based on Inazuma), dir. Mikio Naruse
 1953: Wife (based on Chairo no me), dir. Mikio Naruse
 1954: Late Chrysanthemums (also incorporating the short stories Narcissus and Shirosagi), dir. Mikio Naruse
 1955: Floating Clouds, dir. Mikio Naruse
 1962: A Wanderer's Notebook (based on Diary of a Vagabond), dir. Mikio Naruse
 1986: Wandering Days (anime short, based on Diary of a Vagabond)

Hayashi's biography also served as the basis for theatre plays, notably Kazuo Kikuta's 1961 Hourou-ki, about her early life, and Hisashi Inoue's 2002 Taiko tataite, fue fuite, based on her later years, including her entanglement with the militarist regime.

Notes

References

Bibliography

External links

 J'Lit | Authors : Fumiko Hayashi | Books from Japan 
 
 
 Full text of an English translation of Hayashi Fumiko's fairy tale The Crane’s Flute  (鶴の笛)

1900s births
Year of birth uncertain
1951 deaths
Japanese women poets
Japanese women novelists
Japanese women short story writers
Feminist writers
20th-century Japanese poets
20th-century Japanese novelists
20th-century Japanese women writers
People from Shimonoseki
20th-century Japanese short story writers